The Room is a 2019 thriller film directed by Christian Volckman and starring Olga Kurylenko, Kevin Janssens, Joshua Wilson, John Flanders and Francis Chapman. The film follows a young couple who discover a way to fulfill all of their material desires, but then go too far by using it to create a child. It premiered on 15 April 2019 at the Brussels International Fantastic Film Festival.

Plot
Matt and Kate, a young couple, move to Upstate New York, having purchased a home. While renovating, they discover a large hidden room and that a murder occurred on the property decades before.

That evening, Matt learns that the killer is a "John Doe" and that he is still alive and in a psychiatric hospital. He also inadvertently discovers that the Room can grant any wish. He tells Kate and both quit their jobs with the Room providing everything they desire.

Kate falls into depression when she realizes that nothing they wish for has any real value. To cheer her up, Matt tells her he wants to try for a child, but she becomes angry, reminding him of two previous miscarriages. She exclaims that she can't put herself through that pain again and storms out of the room, but ends up using the Room to create a baby, Shane. Matt wants her to use the Room to uncreate the baby, but neither she nor Matt are actually able to bring themselves to do so. Later, Matt goes to visit "John Doe."

At the hospital, Matt speaks with the "John Doe," who warns that he and his wife should leave the house and forget the Room. Matt finds out that Room-created items age to dust when crossing over the threshold of the house. Kate tells Matt she is taking the baby out for some fresh air; he tries to dissuade her but ultimately does not stop her. Once the baby is outdoors, he ages to a young child in seconds; Kate screams for Matt, who runs outside and brings Shane back inside the house.

The couple's marriage deteriorates as Kate attempts to parent Shane, while Matt ignores him. Shane grows impatient and bored since Kate will not allow him to leave the house, telling him that he is sick and that there are germs outside. Soon Shane discovers the Room and makes an outside area inside it, causing an argument between the parents. "John Doe" calls the home and reveals to Matt that he was a child wish granted by the Room and he is alive because his parents died, which allowed him to become part of the real world. He tells Matt that if Kate dies, Shane will be able to live outside the house. Kate overhears the conversation and attempts to crash her car but cannot bring herself to do so.  When she returns, the couple reunites and have sex, unknowingly watched by Shane.

The next morning, they discover that Shane has gone outside and aged himself into a man, though he still has the mind of a child and is angry with Kate for lying to him about the germs. This causes an altercation, and Kate and Matt are knocked out. Shane uses the Room to enlarge the outdoor area even further and duplicate the house inside it. He shapeshifts into Matt and kidnaps Kate to the cloned home.

Matt awakens a short time later and searches for Kate. He discovers the cloned house and breaks in as Shane rapes Kate. Kate and Matt knock out Shane and try to escape, but they realize Shane used the Room to make a labyrinth in the cloned home. Shane finds them in the house and stabs and kills Matt, but realizes that Matt and Kate have used the Room to replicate themselves, and that the real Matt and Kate have escaped. Ultimately, they trick Shane into going outside, where he rapidly ages into a duplicate of "John Doe" and dies, deteriorating into a pile of dust.

A month later the couple has abandoned the home and are living in a motel. Kate stares in horror at a positive pregnancy test, unsure if the child belongs to Matt or Shane and whether they are in fact still in the Room.

Cast

Release

In 2019, the film was officially selected for Hof International Film Festival (Germany), Sitges International Film Festival of Catalonia (Spain), and Bucheon International Fantastic Film Festival (South Korea), European Fantastic Film Festival (France), Brussels International Fantastic Film Festival (Belgium), Neuchâtel International Fantastic Film Festival (Switzerland), Ostend Film Festival (Belgium).

Reception
The Room received mixed to positive reviews from critics.

References

External links
 
 

2019 films
2019 thriller films
Belgian thriller films
English-language Belgian films
English-language French films
English-language Luxembourgian films
Films about couples
Films set in Maryland
French thriller films
Luxembourgian thriller films
2010s French films